Antonio José Teodoro Ros de Olano y Perpiñá (9 November 1808 – 24 July 1886) was a Spanish writer, politician and military officer who served in the First Carlist War and the Spanish–Moroccan War.

Biography 
Born in Caracas, Captaincy General of Venezuela, he moved to Mainland Spain at age five.
He briefly served as Minister of Commerce, Instruction and Public Works in 1847.

Following his participation in the battle of Guad-el-Jelú ("Sweet River"), decisive for the outcome of the War in Morocco, he was endowed the nobiliary titles of Marquis of Guad-el-Jelú, Count of La Almina, and Viscount of Ros.

References 
Citations

Bibliography
 
 
Further reading
 Ricardo Navas Ruiz, El Romanticismo español. Madrid: Cátedra, 1982 (3.ª ed.).
 Azorín, Antonio Ros. ABC, 18-Ene-1947 (en Varios hombres y alguna mujer. Barcelona, 1962).

External links

Obras digitalizadas de Antonio Ros de Olano en la Biblioteca Digital Hispánica de la Biblioteca Nacional de España

|-

1808 births
1886 deaths
Military personnel of the First Carlist War
Spanish generals
Venezuelan male writers
19th-century Spanish writers
Government ministers of Spain
Venezuelan emigrants to Spain
Writers from Caracas
19th-century male writers
Spanish military personnel of the Hispano-Moroccan War (1859–60)
Spanish writers